Soul Sanctuary

Soul Sanctuary Church in Winnipeg Fresh I.E.
Soul Sanctuary magazine Figures of Light
Soul Sanctuary (Hollywood Blue Flames, 2005) Larry Taylor
"Soul Sanctuary" Emancipation (Prince album)